KHDN (1230 AM) is a radio station broadcasting a News Talk Information format. Licensed to Hardin, Montana, United States, the station serves the Billings metropolitan area. The station is currently owned by Montana Radio Company and features programming from Salem Radio Network and Townhall News.

History
The station was assigned the call letters KHDN in 1963. The call letters changed to KYTY on August 10, 1984.  On September 10, 1986, the station changed its call sign to KBSR, on March 28, 1989, to KKUL, and on June 1, 1995 to the current KHDN.

References

External links

FCC History Cards for KHDN

HDN
Radio stations established in 1963
News and talk radio stations in the United States
1963 establishments in Montana